Father Chase Michael Hilgenbrinck (born April 2, 1982) is an American retired soccer player who played as a defender. He is notable for walking away from his professional career to become a Catholic priest.

Early life
His parents, Mike (a regional sales manager for a fertilizer dealership) and Kim (an accountant with State Farm Insurance), raised their children as Catholics. They brought him and his older brother, Blaise, to church every Sunday, where both sons served as altar boys at Holy Trinity Church in Bloomington, Illinois. Chase played soccer for University High School in Normal, Illinois.

Soccer career
Hilgenbrinck made the United States Under-17 national team, before moving on to play for Clemson University, where he was a three-year starter, playing on the same defensive line as future U.S. senior national team fixture Oguchi Onyewu.

After graduating in 2004, Chase was undrafted by Major League Soccer (MLS) after a decent college career. Claudio Arias, the Chilean soccer coach at nearby Southern Wesleyan University, suggested going to Chile where he thought he could help Chase get a contract. Hilgenbrinck signed with Huachipato of Chile's top division, but was loaned out to lower division club Deportes Naval.  He eventually moved on to second-division club Ñublense and helped them to achieve promotion to Chile's top flight. In all, he spent four seasons in Chile, with three clubs, and grew to become a star player.

He joined the Colorado Rapids in early 2008, but was waived during the pre-season without making a senior appearance after the Rapids needed to clear salary cap space for other acquisitions. Two weeks later the New England Revolution called, and after a two-day tryout, the Revolution signed him on March 28.

Hilgenbrinck's last game was on a Sunday, July 13, 2008, at Gillette Stadium in Foxborough, Massachusetts when the New England Revolution faced Mexican club Santos Laguna in a SuperLiga game.

Catholic priest
In the summer of 2007, the vocation director for the Catholic Diocese of Peoria, Illinois, sent him an extensive application packet. He had to write a 20-page autobiography and submit responses to a series of essay questions, in addition to a background check and fingerprinting. In December, the day after he returned to the U.S. following the end of the soccer season in Chile, he went through an entire battery of testing. He took five written exams in one day, and was evaluated by three psychologists.

Hilgenbrinck retired from soccer on July 14, 2008 to enter the Catholic Mount St. Mary's Seminary at Mount St. Mary's University in Emmitsburg, Maryland in order to become a priest. He was ordained a priest in the diocese of Peoria on May 24, 2014. He served as a parochial vicar for St. Anne's Catholic Church in East Moline, Illinois, as well as one of the chaplains at Alleman High School in Rock Island, Illinois.

On June 8, 2016, Fr. Chase was assigned to St. John's Catholic Newman Center in Champaign, Illinois. At St. John's Catholic Newman Center, Fr. Chase combined sport and faith with the Stations of the Cross Workout he coordinated for parishioners.

On September 13, 2020, Fr. Chase celebrated his last mass as Assistant Chaplain at St. John's Catholic Newman Center, as he had been appointed as the new vocation director for the Catholic Diocese of Peoria, Illinois.

References

Living people
1982 births
American Roman Catholic priests
Catholics from Illinois
American soccer players
Soccer players from Illinois
Sportspeople from Quincy, Illinois
Association football defenders
Clemson Tigers men's soccer players
C.D. Huachipato footballers
Ñublense footballers
Colorado Rapids players
New England Revolution players
Major League Soccer players
American expatriate soccer players
Expatriate footballers in Chile
American expatriate sportspeople in Chile